The National Pasta Association (NPA) is a trade association of professionals in the United States pasta industry.  The NPA originally formed as The National Association of Macaroni and Noodle Manufacturers of America in 1904, making it one of the oldest trade associations in the United States.

History
The first commercial pasta plant in the United States was founded in 1848 in Brooklyn, New York. By the turn of the century, the pasta industry had reached a growth point that triggered a large group of industry members to assemble in Pittsburgh for a discussion of manufacturing and marketing issues. The result of this meeting was the establishment of the National Macaroni Manufacturers Association. In 1981, the name was changed to the National Pasta Association.

Mission statement
Increase the consumption of pasta
Promote the development of sound public policy
Act as a center of knowledge for the industry and the consumer

Committees
Communications
Government Affairs
History
Technical Affairs

Presidents
 1904–1905 Thomas H. Toomey
 1919–1921 James T. William
 1922–1928 Henry Mueller
 1928–1930 Frank J. Tharinger
 1930–1932 Frank L. Zerega
 1932–1933 Alfonso Gioia
 1941–1948 C. W. Jack Wolfe
 1950–1952 C. Frederick Mueller
 1952–1959 Thomas A. Cuneo
 1968–1970 Vincent DeDomenico
 1978–1980 Paul A. Vermylen
 1980–1982 Lester R. Thurston Jr.
 1983–1992 Joseph M. Lichtenberg
 1992–2000 Jula J. Kinnaird

Publications
The New Macaroni Journal from May 1919 (volume 1, number 1) until December 1923 (volume 5, number 8)
The Macaroni Journal from January 1924 (volume 5, number 9) until December 1984 (volume 66, number 8)
Pasta Journal from January 1985 (volume 1, number 1) until April 2000, when the publication was discontinued.

Notes

Trade associations based in the United States
Pasta industry
Organizations established in 1904